Jameh Mosque of Ashtarjan is a mosque in Ashtarjan, Iran, located 36 kilometers south-west of Isfahan.

History 

Commissioned by an Ilkhanid administrator from Ashtarjan and dated by two separate inscriptions to 1315–16, this mosque has survived in excellent condition. Construction appears to have been swift, executed in phases over a brief period. The calligraphy inside the mosque mentions Ahmad ebn Banna and Haji Mohammad Kashi Tarash as the builders in charge of construction of the mosque. One of the main reasons for this mosque’s survival after more than seven centuries is the metal wires that are placed inside the walls of the mosque that hold it together.

Specifications 

The mosque has an area of 1500 square meters, and has two northern and southern gates. The northern gate is 13 meters tall and surrounded by remnants of two brick minarets that are decorated with turquoise tiles. Only one third of these minarets survive; they were constructed in such a way that swinging one minaret would cause the swinging of the other one. The southern gate of the mosque is 7 meters tall and decorated with colorful plasterwork.

The structure of the mosque consists of a narrow rectangular courtyard lined on three sides by arcaded prayer halls; on the fourth side, a vaulted iwan fronts a dome chamber. The main entrance portal with flanking cylindrical minarets is located on the northern exterior façade, off axis with the sanctuary – possibly due to constrictions of pre-existing structures. 
The mosque is built with a mud brick core faced with fired brick. The dome chamber appears to have been erected slightly earlier, utilizing thick plaster over the mud brick core. The use of mud brick is unusual in the vicinity of Isfahan, where fired brick prevails.

The decoration is of greater importance than the primary structure. The diversity of patterns, materials, and combination of materials employed in the decoration represent a compendium of decorative techniques from around the country. Exposed brick is found only in the arcades, although possibly this area originally had a plaster coat as is employed extensively in the rest of the structure. The plaster is carved in a variety of decorative designs, including geometric patterns; floral motifs in high relief; simulated brick bond, and brick end-plugs – in some areas arranged to configure rectangular kufic inscriptions. On the sanctuary walls and dome, traces indicate that plaster was painted in a vivid array of colors. The lofty stucco mihrab describes an uncommon proportion, reaching the zone of transition. Across the interior of the dome, decorative terracotta elements form eight radial ribs; diverse painted plaster patterns fill the interstices. The northern entrance portal is lavishly decorated with mosaic faience, glazed and unglazed terracotta.

See also
 Islam in Iran

References

External links 

 ArchNet Digital Library

Buildings and structures completed in 1316
14th-century mosques
Mosques in Isfahan Province
Buildings and structures in Isfahan Province
Tourist attractions in Isfahan Province
Mosque buildings with domes
National works of Iran
Ashtarjan